Helaine Selin (born 1946) is an American librarian, historian of science, author and the editor of several bestselling books.

Career

Selin attended Binghamton University, where she earned her bachelor's degree. She received her  MLS from SUNY Albany. She was a Peace Corps volunteer from the fall of 1967 through the summer of 1969 as a teacher of English and African History in Karonga, Malawi. She retired in 2012 from being the science librarian at Hampshire College.

Selin is well known for being the editor of Encyclopaedia of the History of Science, Technology, and Medicine in Non-Western Cultures (1997, 2008 and third edition 2016) which is one of the first books which allows readers to "compare a variety of traditional systems of mathematics and cosmologies." Mathematics Across Cultures: The History of Non-Western Mathematics (2000), is considered by Mathematical Intelligencer as a companion to the Encyclopaedia of the History of Science, Technology, and Medicine in Non-Western Cultures. The journal, Mathematics and Computer Education, wrote that Mathematics Across Cultures filled a gap in the history of mathematics and was "an exciting collection of papers on ethnomathematics." Selin's editorial work, Nature Across Cultures: Views of Nature and the Environment in Non-Western Cultures (2003), was considered by Polylog to be a "valuable source for intercultural philosophers." Selin edited the Encyclopaedia of Classical Indian Sciences (2007). She has also edited several more books in the Science Across Cultures series: Medicine Across Cultures, Nature and the Environment Across Cultures, Childbirth Across Cultures, Parenting Across Cultures (second edition 2022), Happiness Across Cultures, Death Across Cultures and Aging Across Cultures.

Bibliography

 (ed.) Encyclopaedia of the History of Science, Technology, and Medicine in Non-Western Cultures, Dordrecht; Boston: Kluwer Academic, 1997.
 (ed. with Xiaochun Sun) Astronomy Across Cultures: the history of non-Western astronomy, Dordrecht; Boston: Kluwer Academic, 2000. Science across cultures 1.
 (ed. with Ubiratan D'Ambrosio) Mathematics Across Cultures: the history of non-western mathematics, Dordrecht; Boston: Kluwer Academic, 2000. Science across cultures 2.
 (ed. with Hugh Shapiro) Medicine Across Cultures: history and practice of medicine in non-Western cultures, Dordrecht; Boston: Kluwer Academic, 2003. Science across cultures 3.
 (ed. with Arne Kalland) Nature Across Cultures: views of nature and the environment in non-western cultures, Dordrecht; Boston: Kluwer Academic, 2003. Science across cultures 4.
 (ed. with Roddam Narasimha) Encyclopaedia of classical Indian sciences, Hyderabad: Universities Press, distributed by Orient Longman, 2007.
 (ed.) Encyclopaedia of the History of Science, Technology, and Medicine in Non-Western Cultures, 2nd. edition. New York, Berlin: Springer, 2008.
 (ed. with Pamela Kendall Stone) Childbirth across cultures: ideas and practices of pregnancy, childbirth and the postpartum, Dordrecht; New York : Springer, 2009. Science across cultures 5.
 (ed. with Gareth Davey) Happiness across cultures: views of happiness and quality of life in non-Western cultures, Dordrecht; New York: Springer, 2012. Science across cultures 6.
 Parenting Across Cultures: Childrearing, Motherhood and Fatherhood in Non-Western Cultures. Dordrecht; New York: Springer, 2014. 7.
 (ed.) Encyclopaedia of the History of Science, Technology, and Medicine in Non-Western Cultures, 3rd. edition. New York, Berlin: Springer, 2016.8.
 (ed. with Robert Rakoff) "Death Across Cultures: Death and Dying in Non-Western Cultures", Dordrecht, New York: Springer, 2019. 9.
 (ed.) "Aging Across Cultures: Growing Old in the Non-Western World", Cham, Switzerland, Springer Nature, 2021. 10.
 (ed. with Hilal H. Sen) "Childhood in Turkey: Educational, Sociological and Psychological Perspectives." Cham, Switzerland, Springer Nature, 2022. 11.
(ed.) "Parenting Across Cultures" Second Edition. Springer, 2022

References

External links
 Helaine Selin  at hampedia.org
 Helaine Selin at goodreads.com

1946 births
Living people
Historians of science
Ethnomathematicians
American librarians
American women librarians
Hampshire College faculty
Binghamton University alumni
American women academics
21st-century American women